Kelton House, also known as the Curtis Kelton House and Pyatt House, is a historic home located at Hartville, Wright County, Missouri, United States.  It was built about 1895, and incorporates an earlier timber frame central passage plan I-house dated to the mid-1870s.  It is a two-story, Late Victorian-style frame dwelling.  Also on the property is a contributing smokehouse.

It was listed on the National Register of Historic Places in 1983.

This home also sits on the battlefield of The Battle of Hartville, 1863. The 99th Illinois was stationed at the location where the house is built during the battle.

References

Houses on the National Register of Historic Places in Missouri
Victorian architecture in Missouri
Houses completed in 1895
Buildings and structures in Wright County, Missouri
National Register of Historic Places in Wright County, Missouri